Just the Two of Us is the 2013 and 8th album by Secret Garden.

The purely instrumental album features Secret Garden  playing some of their most popular songs re-envisioned as duo arrangements along with two new pieces: the title-track “Just the Two of Us” and “En Passant”.

Rolf Løvland described the album, “Our music always starts with just the two of us – Rolf & Fionnuala; even when we’re performing with a full production on stage. So it feels natural and good to perform some of our music in the most intimate and stripped-down version – that musical place where Secret Garden was born.” 

The album debuted at number seven on the Billboard Top New Age Albums chart.

Track listing

References

Secret Garden (duo) albums
2013 albums